Catino is a village in the commune of Poggio Catino, Rieti, Italy.

Catino may also refer to:

Sacro Catino, an artifact
Gregory of Catino (1060–aft. 1130), a monk of the Abbey of Farfa
Charlie Catino, designer of the 2005 board game Nexus Ops

See also
 Cataño